Resistance Day, formerly known as Resistance Day, is the professional holiday of the Tatmadaw, celebrated annually on 27 March. It commemorates the start of Burmese Army's resistance to Japanese occupation in 1945. The holiday has been referred to as Anti-Fascist-Resistance Day by participants in the 2021 Myanmar protests.

Holiday events

Military parade 
The main event of the holiday is a military parade in central Naypyidaw, the capital, and formerly held in Yangon. The reviewing officer of the parade is the Commander-in-Chief of Defence Services, a billet of a general ranked officer usually holding Senior General (equivalent to Field Marshal) rank.

Parades in past years:

 2013: Nobel Peace Prize laureate Aung San Suu Kyi was notably among the attendees.
 2019: Senior General Min Aung Hlaing was unable to attend the 74th Armed Forces Day event leaving his deputy, Vice Senior General Soe Win, to represent him instead.
2020: The parade of 2020 commemorating the 75th anniversary of the defeat of Japanese forces was postponed due to the COVID-19 pandemic in Myanmar. The Myanmar military declared it would plan the diamond jubilee celebrations after the World Health Organization declares that the disease is under control. Among the expected attendees included National League for Democracy leader Tin Oo and former Prime Minister of Myanmar Than Shwe.
2021: The 76th Armed Forces Day parade was scaled back to follow health guidelines. Russian Deputy Defence Minister Alexander Fomin was one of the dignitaries in attendance.

Other events 
An evening dinner is among the other events that are held on 27 March.

Gallery

2021 incidents on Armed Forces Day 
On 27 March 2021, during the 76th annual Armed Forces Day, at least 107 were reported to have been killed, with news outlet Myanmar Now reporting 114 deaths, the highest death toll of any individual day since the Myanmar protests began after the coup d'état on 1 February, staged by Min Aung Hlaing, the commander-in-chief of the Armed Forces.

Earlier that day, the Myanmar military launched airstrikes on a village controlled by ethnic army the Karen National Union, which had earlier taken over an army post near the Myanmar–Thailand border, killing ten people including a lieutenant colonel. General Yawd Serk of the Restoration Council of Shan State/Shan State Army-South stated during an interview "The Myanmar Armed Forces Day isn't an armed forces day, it's more like the day they killed people", and "If they continue to shoot at protesters and bully the people, I think all the ethnic groups would not just stand by and do nothing."

The European Union delegation to Myanmar has stated "This 76th Myanmar armed forces day will stay engraved as a day of terror and dishonour", with U.S. Ambassador Thomas Vajda saying "security forces are murdering unarmed civilians" and calling for "an immediate end to the violence and the restoration of the democratically elected government".

See also 

 Independence Day (Myanmar)
Burmese Martyrs' Day

References 

Military of Myanmar
Armed Forces days
Public holidays in Myanmar